Silog is a class of Filipino breakfast dishes containing sinangag (fried rice) and itlog (egg; in context, fried egg). They are served with various viands or ulam, usually meat dishes such as tapa, longganisa or ham. The name of the accompanying meat dish determines the portmanteau name of the silog; for example, the former three would be known as tapsilog, longsilog, and hamsilog.

History
The first type of silog to be named as such was the tapsilog. It was originally intended to be quick breakfast or late-night hangover fare. It developed from tapsi, which referred to meals of beef tapa and sinangag with no fried egg explicitly mentioned, and diners which mainly or exclusively served such meals were called tapahan or tapsihan in Filipino. The term tapsilog was originally established in the 1980s and came from the Tapsi ni Vivian ("Vivian's Tapsi") restaurant in Marikina. According to Vivian del Rosario, owner of Tapsi ni Vivian, she was the first to use the term tapsilog.

Due to the popularity of this type of cuisine in the Philippines, some restaurants, fast food chains such as Jollibee and McDonald's Philippines and even hotels have included silogs on their breakfast menus, and some restaurants and fast food chains like Tapa King and Rufo's Famous Tapa exclusively or mainly serve this type of dish. Some diners like the first Tapsi ni Vivian in Marikina and Rodic's Diner in the University of the Philippines Diliman campus in Quezon City have also opened other branches after becoming recognized for their silog dishes.

Types of silog

Following the development of tapsilog, many other types of silog have been created, all based around garlic-fried rice and fried egg, and suffixed with -silog. Due to the malleable nature of the dish, basically anything can be silog if served with fried rice and fried egg. Abbreviated examples (in alphabetical order) commonly seen in silog eateries and restaurants include:
 Adosilog – adobo, fried rice and fried egg.
 Bacsilog or baconsilog – bacon, fried rice and fried egg.
 Bisteksilog – beef steak, fried rice and fried egg.
 Daingsilog – daing na isda (dried fish), fried rice and fried egg.
 Bangsilog – dried (daing), marinated bangus (milkfish), fried rice and fried egg.
 Dangsilog – daing na danggit (dried rabbitfish), fried rice and fried egg.
 Chiksilog or noksilog – fried chicken (piniritong manok or pritong manok), fried rice and fried egg.
 Chosilog – chorizo, fried rice and fried egg.
 Cornsilog – corned beef, fried rice and fried egg.
 Hotsilog – hot dog, fried rice and fried egg.
 Litsilog or lechonsilog – lechon or lechon kawali, fried rice and fried egg.
 Longsilog – longganisa, fried rice and fried egg.
 Masilog or malingsilog - Ma-Ling brand Chinese luncheon meat, fried rice and fried egg.
 Porksilog – pork chop, fried rice and fried egg.
 Sisilog - sisig, fried rice and fried egg.
 Spamsilog – Spam brand luncheon meat, fried rice and fried egg.
 Tosilog or tocilog – tocino, fried rice and fried egg.

Beef pares, another common Filipino short-order diner dish, may sometimes be known as "paresilog", "paressilog", etc. if served with a fried egg, since both dishes traditionally include fried rice.

There is a similar dish from Malaysia, the nasi lemak, which is served in a variety of manners using meat, egg and rice with coconut milk.

While a proper silog has sinangag or fried rice, some diners have tried passing off the "si" in silog to stand for sinaing, plain boiled rice, in order to cut costs. Sometimes the boiled rice is topped with fried garlic flakes and passed off as "garlic rice", though the term "garlic rice" is properly understood as rice stir-fried with garlic. More honest places will call this "kalog", from kanin, the general term for cooked rice. It is also possible to come across "silog" as its own menu option which is just fried rice and egg. If one wishes an additional fried egg, the order may sometimes have an additional "log"; i.e., tapsilog with extra egg is "tapsiloglog", etc. and this may be extended ad infinitum.

See also
 List of egg dishes
 List of rice dishes

References

Philippine rice dishes